Hazleydi Yoreli Rincón Torres (born 27 July 1993) is a Colombian professional footballer who plays as a midfielder for Italian Serie A club UC Sampdoria and the Colombia women's national team. She previously played professional football for clubs in Brazil, Sweden and United States. Rincón debuted for the Colombia women's national football team in 2010 and was included in the national team for the 2012 London Olympics, as well as the FIFA Women's World Cup in 2011 and 2015.

Early life
Born in Piedecuesta, Rincón began playing football in the Colombian league at age 12, winning the national league with Tolima in 2007. She made a verbal commitment to join Indiana University to play collegiate soccer beginning in 2011, but backed out to embark on a professional career.

Club career
At age 18, Rincón signed a one-year contract with Campeonato Paulista de Futebol Feminino club XV de Piracicaba after being recommended by fellow Colombian footballer Freddy Rincón.

In January 2013 Rincón made a transfer to Swedish Damallsvenskan team LdB FC Malmö. With Malmö she started two of 12 appearances in 2013 and scored once, against Piteå IF, as the club recaptured their league title. After that first season Rincón was released by Malmö, for economic reasons.

Rincón was invited to Western New York Flash's preseason training camp in March 2014. She joined New Jersey Wildcats of the W-League for the 2014 season. Rincón intended to gain experience, adapt to the American style of soccer and ultimately win a move to the National Women's Soccer League (NWSL).

Rincón competed at the 2019 WAFF Women's Clubs Championship for Bahraini club Riffa SC, scoring twice in four matches.

International career
Rincón has played as a midfielder for the Colombia women's national football team, scoring five goals as Colombia finished as runners-up in the 2010 Sudamericano Femenino and helping her team qualify for its first ever FIFA Women's World Cup finals. She also played for Colombia at the 2008 FIFA U-17 Women's World Cup and 2010 FIFA U-20 Women's World Cup finals.

She was also named in the Colombian squad for the 2012 Olympics. Colombia were beaten in all three group matches as the team's coach controversially omitted Rincón, accusing her of arriving at the tournament in poor condition. Rincón played at her second FIFA Women's World Cup in 2015. In July 2016, team captain Rincón, "widely considered Colombia's best player", broke her leg and was ruled out of the 2016 Olympics.

Personal life
Rincón is bisexual. She was in a relationship with a man called Alejandro González, but is now dating with Venezuelan female footballer Jaylis Oliveros.

Honors

Individual
 IFFHS CONMEBOL Woman Team of the Decade 2011–2020

References

External links
Profile at Futbol Femenino en Colombia

1993 births
Living people
Sportspeople from Santander Department
Colombian women's footballers
Women's association football midfielders
FC Rosengård players
Torres Calcio Femminile players
Inter Milan (women) players
Riffa SC players
U.C. Sampdoria (women) players
Damallsvenskan players
USL W-League (1995–2015) players
Campeonato Brasileiro de Futebol Feminino Série A1 players
Colombia women's international footballers
2011 FIFA Women's World Cup players
2015 FIFA Women's World Cup players
Olympic footballers of Colombia
Footballers at the 2012 Summer Olympics
Colombian expatriate women's footballers
Colombian expatriate sportspeople in Brazil
Expatriate women's footballers in Brazil
Colombian expatriate sportspeople in Sweden
Expatriate women's footballers in Sweden
Colombian expatriate sportspeople in the United States
Expatriate women's soccer players in the United States
Colombian expatriate sportspeople in Italy
Expatriate women's footballers in Italy
Colombian expatriate sportspeople in Norway
Expatriate women's footballers in Norway
Colombian expatriates in Bahrain
Expatriate footballers in Bahrain
Bisexual sportspeople
Bisexual women
Colombian bisexual people
LGBT association football players
Colombian LGBT sportspeople
Association footballers' wives and girlfriends